Robert Lowell Heise (born May 12, 1947) is an American former professional baseball infielder, who played in Major League Baseball (MLB) for seven teams, from 1967 to 1977.

Early years
Heise was a "military brat" born in San Antonio, Texas, but he spent most of his youth in California. As a junior at Vacaville High School in Vacaville, California, he was part of the Bulldogs team that won the  Golden Empire League championship. In February 1965, Heise signed as an amateur free agent with the New York Mets.

New York Mets
In his major league debut, he collected his first hit, a single off Atlanta Braves pitcher Jay Ritchie, and was promptly erased trying to steal second. Facing the Los Angeles Dodgers on September 19, his fifth inning double scored two runs to tie the game. He then scored the winning run on Tommy Davis' single.

Heise batted .323 his first September in the major leagues. He spent  in the minors with the AAA Jacksonville Suns. He split his time pretty evenly between second base and shortstop in Jacksonville. When he received his callup to the majors that September, he played mostly shortstop.

Heise was part of a proposed trade package along with Ed Kranepool and Amos Otis when the Mets attempted to acquire the Braves' Joe Torre who went to the St. Louis Cardinals for Orlando Cepeda instead. He spent  playing shortstop for the triple A Tidewater Tides. He joined the Mets again that September, going 3-for-10 in four games, but was not part of the "Miracle Mets" post season roster. Heise was sent along with Jim Gosger from the Mets to the San Francisco Giants for Ray Sadecki and Dave Marshall on December 12, 1969.

San Francisco Giants
He spent most of the season backing up Hal Lanier at short until an injury to fellow ex-Met Ron Hunt made him the starting second baseman for the month of September. Considering his limited playing time, Heise put up respectable numbers. His 22 runs batted in (RBI) was a career high, and came in just 154 at bats. On April 18, Heise went 3-for-5 with five RBI in a 16-9 victory over the Cincinnati Reds. On June 26, he hit his first career triple, and on June 30, he hit his only career home run off the San Diego Padres' Danny Coombs.

Milwaukee Brewers
Heise appeared in thirteen games and was hitless in eleven at bats for the Giants when he was traded to the Milwaukee Brewers for Floyd Wicker on June 1, . Shortly after his arrival in Milwaukee, Heise took over as the Brewers' starting shortstop. He had an eight game hitting streak during July (July 18–30), and in August, had three three hit games (August 4, 10, and 14).

In , Heise began seeing more playing time at third base, a position he had only appeared at a handful of times up to that point. The move allowed Heise to appear in a career high 95 games, and log a career high 271 at bats. The highlight of his season was June 24, when his double off Sonny Siebert scored two runs in the Brewers' 5-2 victory over the Boston Red Sox.

The Brewers completely overhauled their infield for the  season. During the off season, they acquired third baseman Don Money from the Philadelphia Phillies. Just as the season started, they acquired shortstop Tim Johnson from the Dodgers, and second base was taken over by rookie Pedro García. This substantially cut into Heise's playing time. He appeared in 49 games, only 23 of which were starts, and batted just .204 for the season. He was traded to the St. Louis Cardinals for Tom Murphy on December 8, 1973.

St. Louis Cardinals
Heise spent the majority of his short time with the Cardinals organization in triple A, with the Tulsa Oilers. He came up briefly, playing in all three games of a series played in the Astrodome against the Houston Astros, in early July . Heise was then dealt to the California Angels for a player to be named later (PTBNL).

California Angels
While with the California Angels, Heise saw pretty regular action, backing up second and third base. He appeared in 29 games, from August 3 to the end of the season.

Heise’s trade to the Boston Red Sox for Tommy Harper at the Winter Meetings on December 2, 1974, was driven by the Red Sox using its outfielder surplus to address its lack of infielder depth.

Boston Red Sox
Heise played an important bench role for the 1975 American League Championship Series winning Red Sox. In the first two weeks of July, while Rico Petrocelli was sidelined by an eye injury, Heise batted .344 with seven runs and seven RBIs. He played all eighteen innings of a July 6 doubleheader with the Cleveland Indians. In the first game, he drove in three of the five Bosox's runs to carry his team to a 5-3 victory. In the second game, he went 3-for-4 with two runs scored and two RBI in his team's 11-10 loss. For the season, he batted .214 with 21 RBI. Though he was on the Red Sox post season roster, he did not appear in any post season games.

Though Heise was healthy throughout the  season, he saw incredibly limited action. Heise appeared in only 32 games, and logged just 61 plate appearances.

On December 6, 1976, Heise was purchased by the Kansas City Royals.

Kansas City Royals
He was released by the Royals in January 1978, and subsequently chose to retire from active play, at the age of 30.

Career statistics

References

External links

Bob Heise at The Ultimate Mets Database

Major League Baseball shortstops
Major League Baseball second basemen
Major League Baseball third basemen
New York Mets players
San Francisco Giants players
Milwaukee Brewers players
St. Louis Cardinals players
California Angels players
Boston Red Sox players
Kansas City Royals players
Greenville Mets players
Durham Bulls players
Jacksonville Suns players
Tidewater Tides players
Tulsa Oilers (baseball) players
Baseball players from Texas
1947 births
Living people
Florida Instructional League Mets players